The 2016 Port Vila Premier League or 2016 TVL Premier League is the 22nd edition of the Port Vila Premier League, the highest tier of the Port Vila Football League

The top four of the league qualify for the 2016 PVFA Top Four Super League and the two lowest team relegate to the 2017 TVL First Division while the number seven plays a play-off duel against the number two of the 2016 TVL First Division.

Mauriki and Sia-Raga qualified for the league. Mauriki as champions of the 2014–15 TVL First Division while Sia-Raga became second, which means that the league has extended to 9 teams instead of 8.

Before the season, the 2016 PVFA Cup will be held as an opening tournament for all the teams in the 3 highest divisions.

Teams
 Amicale
 Erakor Golden Star
 Ifira Black Bird
 Mauriki
 Shepherds United
 Sia-Raga
 Spirit 08
 Tafea
 Tupuji Imere

Standings

PVFA Top Four Super League
In the 2016 PVFA Top Four Super League, the four teams play each other on a round-robin basis. The winner will join Malampa Revivors in the 2017 OFC Champions League

Matches will take place between 3–17 December 2016. All times are local, VAN (UTC+11).

Relegation playoff
The Port Vila Football Association, the PVFA decided that next season the league will go to 8 teams instead of 9. The two lowest teams automatically relegated and the number seven of the competition, Mauriki, was forced to play a Play-off against the number two of the 2016 Port Vila First Division, Seveners United. Mauriki won the match, which means that they will remain in the Port Vila Premier League for the 2017 season.

References

External links
 

Port Vila Football League seasons
Port
2016–17 in Vanuatuan football
2015–16 in Vanuatuan football